War Wind II: Human Onslaught is a real-time strategy computer game from developer DreamForge Intertainment that was published by Strategic Simulations, Inc. in 1997. It is the sequel to DreamForge's 1996 release War Wind.

Overview
Though favorably reviewed overall, like its predecessor War Wind, Human Onslaught was overshadowed by higher-profile RTS titles such as Age of Empires and StarCraft.

Plot
The storyline of War Wind II involves the discovery of one of the tablets of Naga'Rom in the north pole of Earth. A military/scientific station is located at the site of the tablet's recovery. The tablet is inadvertently activated by the scientists at the facility, transporting all occupants of the facility and much of the surrounding ice to Yavaun.

Meanwhile, on Yavaun, the Eaggra have escaped Tha'Roon rule and have allied themselves with the Shama'Li, forming a faction called S.U.N. (Servants Under Naga'Rom). The Tha'Roon have retained their rule over the Obblinox and the Tha'Roon empire's mission is clear: destroy the S.U.N. Faction and rule Yavaun. As the Tha'Roon come close to victory, a sudden burst of light and a new race emerge on Yavaun: Humans. The Tha'Roon turn their attention to the new invaders and the S.U.N. slip away to regroup.

The game begins years into the conflict between all the inhabitants of Yavaun. The humans have splintered into two groups, or factions. The Marines (children of the soldiers of the facility), whose goal is to conquer the other races and rule Yavaun, and the Descendants (children of the scientists) who seek to return to Earth.

The plot for each faction varies dramatically. The Tha'Roon seek to destroy all other races, while the Marines have a similar goal. The Descendants want to simply return to earth. The S.U.N.'s objective is the most peculiar as they want to free the Obblinox, unite with the Descendants, and create peace on Yavaun.

Reception
GameSpot gave the game 8 out 10.

References

External links
 

1997 video games
Real-time strategy video games
Strategic Simulations games
Video game sequels
Video games about extraterrestrial life
Video games developed in the United States
Video games set on fictional planets
Windows games
Windows-only games
DreamForge Intertainment games
Multiplayer and single-player video games